The 1972 United States Senate election in Colorado took place on November 7, 1972. Incumbent Republican U.S. Senator Gordon Allott ran for re-election to a fourth term, but was narrowly defeated by Democratic former State Representative Floyd Haskell. This would be the last time until 2008 that a Democrat was elected to the Class 2 Senate seat from Colorado.

Democratic primary

Candidates
 Floyd Haskell, former Republican State Representative from Littleton
 Anthony Vollack, State Senator from Arvada

Results
Floyd Haskell, a former State Representative who had served as a Republican from 1965–67, but had left the party in 1970 over opposition to the Vietnam War, won the primary.

General election

Results

See also 
 1972 United States Senate elections

References 

1972
Colorado
United States Senate